The 2002–03 OK Liga was the 34th season of the top-tier league of rink hockey in Spain.

Barcelona finished the league as champion, after beating Noia Freixenet 3–0 in the finals. Noia Freixenet ended in the 12th position at the end of the regular season.

Competition format
Sixteen teams joined the league. The three first teams at the end of the regular season qualified directly for the quarterfinals while teams from fourth to 13th joined the round of 16.

The three last teams were relegated to Primera División.

Regular season

Playoffs
Quarterfinals were played with a best-of-three format, while semifinals and final were played with a best-of-five series.

Seeded teams played games 1, 2 and 5 of the series at home.

Source:

Final standings

Copa del Rey

The 2003 Copa del Rey was the 60th edition of the Spanish men's roller hockey cup. It was played in Vilanova i la Geltrú between the seven first qualified teams after the first half of the season and Vilanova RMS as host team.

Barcelona won their 15th trophy.

References

External links
Real Federación Española de Patinaje

OK Liga seasons
2002 in roller hockey
2003 in roller hockey
2002 in Spanish sport
2003 in Spanish sport